Heterocercus is a genus of bird in the family Pipridae. Established by Philip Lutley Sclater in 1862, it contains the following species:

The name Heterocercus is a combination of the Greek words heteros, meaning "different" and kerkos, meaning "tail".

References

 
Bird genera
Taxa named by Philip Sclater
Taxonomy articles created by Polbot